Balnapaling  is a village on the north side of the Cromarty Firth, opposite Cromarty, located in eastern Ross-shire, Scottish Highlands and is in the Scottish council area of Highland.

References

Populated places in Ross and Cromarty